Edmond De Weck (28 April 1901 – March 1977) was a Swiss footballer. He played in nine matches for the Switzerland national football team between 1923 and 1927.

References

External links
 
 

1901 births
1977 deaths
Swiss men's footballers
Switzerland international footballers
Place of birth missing
Association football defenders
FC Fribourg players
Grasshopper Club Zürich players